Stigmella stigmaciella is a moth of the family Nepticulidae. It is found in British Columbia, Canada.

The larvae feed on Crataegus species. They mine the leaves of their host plant.

External links
A taxonomic revision of the North American species of Stigmella (Lepidoptera: Nepticulidae)

Nepticulidae
Moths of North America
Moths described in 1979